Nigel Groom  (April 26, 1924 – March 5, 2014) was a British Arabist, historian, author, soldier, counter-espionage officer in MI5 and perfume expert. He was a   noted expert on the pre-Islamic history of  the Arab world.

Biography
Educated at Haileybury and Magdalene College, Cambridge, Groom served in the British Indian Army during the Second World War and fought in the Burma Campaign. Joining the Colonial Office after the war ended, he was posted to the Aden Protectorate in January 1948 and soon found himself in Bayhan as political agent, replacing Peter Davey, who had been killed in a gunfight. During his time in Bayhan he assisted in the construction of the first primary school and introduced the first motor car.

In 1950 he was posted to Dhala and moved to Aden in 1952, where he was Assistant Chief Secretary. From 1958-1962 he was based outside the Arabian Peninsula for the first time in his colonial career, moving to Nairobi in Kenya.

Groom joined the Security Service in 1962. His obituary in the journal of the British-Yemeni Society notes he was 'too discreet and too modest' to discuss this aspect of his career, but his contribution was noted with the award of an OBE in 1974.

Published works

Nigel Groom, Perfume: The Ultimate Guide to the World's Finest Fragrances  1999, Running Press Book Publishers

Personal life
Groom’s wife died in 2009; he was survived by a son and a daughter.

Honours
  Officer of the Most Excellent Order of the British Empire - 1974

References

1924 births
2014 deaths
MI5 personnel
Commanders of the Order of the British Empire
Alumni of Magdalene College, Cambridge
People educated at Haileybury and Imperial Service College
British people in colonial India